Pagria is a genus of leaf beetles in the subfamily Eumolpinae. It is known from Africa, Asia and Australia.

Species

 Pagria annulicornis Pic, 1950
 Pagria apicalis Pic, 1940
 Pagria australis Bryant, 1942
 Pagria bengalensis Moseyko & Medvedev, 2005
 Pagria bipustulata (Baly, 1867)
 Pagria bisignata Pic, 1949
 Pagria brevenotata Pic, 1952
 Pagria burmanica Jacoby, 1908
 Pagria camerunensis (Jacoby, 1904)
 Pagria ceylonica Pic, 1929
 Pagria concinna (Weise, 1895)
 Pagria concolor (Motschulsky, 1866)
 Pagria conglomerata Jacoby, 1908
 Pagria consimilis (Baly, 1874)
 Pagria dahomeyensis Pic, 1952
 Pagria donckieri Pic, 1950
 Pagria fossulata Pic, 1952
 Pagria gossypii Bryant, 1933
 Pagria grata (Baly, 1867)
 Pagria ingibbosa Pic, 1929
 Pagria laotica Moseyko, 2013
 Pagria liturata Lefèvre, 1891
 Pagria maculata Moseyko & Medvedev, 2005
 Pagria mahembensis (Selman, 1965)
 Pagria maynei Burgeon, 1941
 Pagria minuta Pic, 1949
 Pagria muiri Bryant, 1942
 Pagria nigrosuturalis (Bryant, 1960)
 Pagria pici Moseyko & Medvedev, 2005
 Pagria porosicollis (Jacoby, 1898)
 Pagria pseudograta Moseyko, 2012
 Pagria restituens (Walker, 1859)
 Pagria ruficeps Pic, 1949
 Pagria rufoscutellaris Pic, 1940
 Pagria ruwenzoriensis Selman, 1972
 Pagria sexmaculata Kimoto & Gressitt, 1982
 Pagria signata (Motschulsky, 1858)
 Pagria sumatrensis Lefèvre, 1887
 Pagria suturalis Lefèvre, 1884
 Pagria ussuriensis Moseyko & Medvedev, 2005
 Pagria varians Lefèvre, 1884
 Pagria vietnamica Moseyko & Medvedev, 2005
 Pagria viridiaenea (Gyllenhal, 1808)

Species moved to other genera:
 Pagria aenescens Jacoby, 1908: moved to Cleoporus
 Pagria laevifrons Jacoby, 1908: moved to Cleoporus
 Pagria minor Pic, 1929: moved to Basilepta
 Pagria monardi Pic, 1940: moved to Sarum
 Pagria pallidicolor Pic, 1929: moved to Basilepta
 Pagria plicata Pic, 1929: moved to Basilepta
 Pagria recticollis Pic, 1929: moved to Cleoporus

Other synonyms:
 Pagria aenea (Motschulsky, 1866): synonym of Pagria restituens (Walker, 1859)
 Pagria aeneicollis Lefèvre, 1890: synonym of Pagria grata (Baly, 1867)
 Pagria bipunctata Lefèvre, 1891: synonym of Pagria signata (Motschulsky, 1858)
 Pagria ceylonensis Jacoby, 1908: synonym of Pagria viridiaenea (Gyllenhal, 1808)
 Pagria costatipennis Jacoby, 1887: synonym of Pagria restituens (Walker, 1859)
 Pagria diversepunctata Pic, 1950: synonym of Pagria signata (Motschulsky, 1858)
 Pagria flavopustulata (Baly, 1874): synonym of Pagria grata (Baly, 1867)
 Pagria kanarensis (Jacoby, 1895): synonym of Pagria grata (Baly, 1867)
 Pagria lineolata Pic, 1949: synonym of Pagria ingibbosa Pic, 1929
 Pagria nodieri Pic, 1949: synonym of Pagria grata (Baly, 1867)
 Pagria vignaphila Bryant, 1942: synonym of Pagria grata (Baly, 1867)
 Pagria xanthopus (Harold, 1874): synonym of Pagria grata (Baly, 1867)

References

External links
 Genus Pagria Lefèvre, 1884 at Australian Faunal Directory

Eumolpinae
Chrysomelidae genera
Beetles of Africa
Beetles of Asia
Beetles of Australia
Taxa named by Édouard Lefèvre